Urban Art Projects (UAP) is an Australian company that works with artists, architects, designers, developers, curators, institutions and art commissioners to realize public art and architectural design elements.

History
The company was founded in 1993 in Brisbane, Australia by brothers Matthew and Daniel Tobin. Its initial name was Urban Artists. The Tobin brothers first purchased a small welding and metal fabrication company that worked on marine and construction projects. Over time, they invested the profits of this first company into the construction of a foundry that could be used for art projects. One of UAP's first clients was the Australian Waanyi multi-media artist Judy Watson.

The company has its main office and studios in Brisbane, and a satellite studio in Shanghai.
In 2017, UAP acquired New York-based foundry, Polich Tallix. The same year, UAP began using a large industrial robot for selected projects at its Brisbane studio.

Notable projects
Hank Willis Thomas' oversized arm sculpture Unity at the foot of the Brooklyn Bridge, cast at UAP's Polich Tallix foundry.
Tow Row, a bronze fishing net sculpture in front of the Queensland Gallery of Modern Art by Judy Watson.
 Arch, part of Ai Weiwei's 2017 project Good Fences make Good Neighbors.
 Wahat Al Karama, a 2018 memorial to fallen Emirati soldiers by Idris Khan. 
Kraken a giant 2017 octopus sculpture for a Shanghai playground. By Florentijn Hofman. 
 Messengers of Brisbane, a series of oversized finch sculptures installed around Brisbane. By the artist Florentijn Hofman.

References 

Australian companies established in 1993
Foundries in Australia
Foundries in the United States